Mary Edna González (born October 30, 1983) is an American politician who serves in the Texas House of Representatives from House District 75. She is a member of the Democratic Party and was elected in November of 2012 to represent an area that includes eastern El Paso County, parts of the city of El Paso and the towns of Socorro, Clint, Fabens, Horizon City, San Elizario and Tornillo.  She is also the first openly pansexual elected official in the United States.

Her primary platforms are to increase economic development, improve public schools, equality, and support agriculture in District 75.

Early life and education

Mary González was born and raised in Clint, Texas and graduated from Clint High School.
González received her bachelor's degree in History and Mexican American Studies from the University of Texas at Austin (UT Austin) and her master's degree in Social Justice from St. Edward's University. In 2019, she received her doctoral degree in Curriculum and Instruction-Cultural Studies in Education from the University of Texas at Austin.

Previous work

Early in her career, González worked for former Texas House Dean Paul Moreno and State Representative Richard Raymond.

Mary González has also worked at the National Hispanic Institute, UT Austin, and was the assistant dean for student multicultural affairs at Southwestern University. She has also worked as a visiting instructor at Southwestern University, and a Graduate Research Assistant at UT Austin where she developed curriculum for the UT Outreach Centers in San Antonio and the Rio Grande Valley. She also served as the Latino Outreach Coordinator for the Texas Democratic Party.

She also served as national president for the Latina-based, service sorority Kappa Delta Chi, from 2013 to 2015. González is also Co-Chair of the board of directors for ALLGO, Texas' statewide Queer People of Color organization.

Political career

Texas House of Representatives

González won the Democratic primary for House District 75 in May 2012. With no Republican opponent, she won in the general election unopposed, being the first woman to represent her district.

During the 85th legislative session, González served on the United States House Committee on Appropriations and was Vice Chair of the House Committee on Agriculture & Livestock. 

During the 86th legislative session, González served on the House Committee on Appropriations, and is a member of the Subcommittee on Article III, which has a primary focus on education. She also served on the Public Education committee and was Vice Chair of the Local & Consent Calendars Committee. 

She is currently serving her second term as Vice Chair of the Mexican American Legislative Caucus, and second term as Secretary of the House Border Caucus. González also serves as Vice Chair of the Board of Hispanic Caucus Chairs. Additionally, González was elected Chair of the new Texas House LGBTQ Caucus, which was formed in January 2019. She was also elected to serve on the nonpartisan board of directors for the National Association of Latino Elected and Appointed Officials (NALEO) Education Fund.

Awards and recognition 
In May 2013, González was named "Freshman of the Year" by Mexican American Legislative Caucus (MALC), the country's oldest and largest Latino legislative caucus.

González was also named a "Champion of Equality" and 2015's "Advocate of the Year" by Equality Texas.

In 2015, González became the youngest inductee to the El Paso Women's Hall of Fame.

González was named one of ten "Next Generation Latinas" by Latina Magazine for her leadership in education. She was also named one of 10 newly elected politicians to watch by NBC Latino.

Election history

2012 election

2014 election

2016 election

See also

 Colonia (United States)
 List of Mexican-American political organizations
 List of pansexual people

References

External links

Living people
Politicians from El Paso, Texas
LGBT state legislators in Texas
St. Edward's University alumni
Texas Democrats
University of Texas at Austin College of Education alumni
Women state legislators in Texas
Pansexual women
1983 births
Hispanic and Latino American state legislators in Texas
Hispanic and Latino American women in politics
21st-century American politicians
21st-century American women politicians
American politicians of Mexican descent